Peg Parnevik (born 3 September 1995) is a Swedish-American singer, songwriter, and television personality, known for starring in the Swedish reality show Parneviks mainly broadcast from their home in Jupiter, Florida.

Life and career

Early life
Parnevik was born in Stockholm to professional golfer Jesper Parnevik and his wife Mia. She has three younger siblings; Penny, Philippa, and Phoenix and was raised in Jupiter, Florida, in the United States. Her paternal grandfather is Swedish impersonator Bosse Parnevik. She attended The Pine School in Hobe Sound. She spent her freshman year of college at Washington and Lee University in Lexington, Virginia. She then  enrolled at Savannah College of Art and Design in Savannah, Georgia.

2015–present: Parneviks and music career
In 2015, Parnevik began starring in the reality show Parneviks broadcast on the Swedish television channel TV3. The show features Parnevik and the rest of her family welcoming Swedish celebrity guests to stay at their Florida mansion. It has won numerous awards in Sweden, including a Kristallen in 2015 for Best Reality Series. Parnevik later signed to Sony Music Sweden as a solo artist and released her debut single "Ain't No Saint" in March 2016. On 3 June 2016, she released the single "We Are (Ziggy & Carola)".

Her song Ain't No Saint charted in second place on the Swedish singleschart. In August 2016 Parnevik participated in Allsång på Skansen broadcast on SVT. She also had her own reality show called Peg på turné to be broadcast on TV3, a show that will follow her way through Sweden when she promotes her new songs.

Discography

Singles

Notes

Filmography

Television

References

Living people
1995 births
Singers from Stockholm
Swedish pop singers
American people of Swedish descent
People from Jupiter, Florida
Savannah College of Art and Design alumni
Swedish television personalities
Swedish women television presenters
Swedish expatriates in the United States
Swedish songwriters
English-language singers from Sweden
21st-century Swedish singers
21st-century Swedish women singers